Quélern is a hamlet in western France.

Quélern may also refer to:
 Quelern Formation, is a geologic formation in France. 
 Fort Quélern, is a castle in France.